The 2020 JC Ferrero Challenger Open was a professional tennis tournament played on clay courts. It was the third edition of the tournament which was part of the 2020 ATP Challenger Tour. It took place in Alicante, Spain between 12 and 18 October 2020. Carlos Alcaraz was the singles winner; the pair of Enzo Couacaud and Albano Olivetti won doubles.

Singles main-draw entrants

Seeds

 1 Rankings are as of 28 September 2020.

Other entrants
The following players received wildcards into the singles main draw:
  Javier Barranco Cosano
  Diego Augusto Barreto Sánchez
  Pol Martín Tiffon

The following player received entry into the singles main draw using a protected ranking:
  Tommy Robredo

The following player received entry into the singles main draw as a special exempt:
  Carlos Gimeno Valero

The following players received entry from the qualifying draw:
  Marcelo Tomás Barrios Vera
  Liam Broady
  Íñigo Cervantes
  Malek Jaziri

The following player received entry as a lucky loser:
  Oriol Roca Batalla

Champions

Singles

 Carlos Alcaraz def.  Pedro Martínez 7–6(8–6), 6–3.

Doubles

 Enzo Couacaud /  Albano Olivetti def.  Íñigo Cervantes /  Oriol Roca Batalla 4–6, 6–4, [10–2].

References

2020 ATP Challenger Tour
2020 in Spanish tennis
October 2020 sports events in Spain